Colonel Dempsey Burgess (1751 – January 13, 1800) was a Democratic-Republican U.S. Congressman from North Carolina between 1795 and 1799.  He was commandeer of the Camden County Regiment of the North Carolina militia during the American Revolution.

He was born in 1751 in Shiloh, Camden County, North Carolina. Burgess was a member of the North Carolina Provincial Congress in 1775 and 1776.

He was an officer in the North Carolina militia during the American Revolutionary War.  His military service record included:
 Major in the Pasquotank County Regiment of the North Carolina militia - 1775-1776
 Lt. Colonel in the 2nd Pasquotank County Regiment of the North Carolina militia - 1776-1777
 Lt. Colonel in the Camden County Regiment of the North Carolina militia - 1777-1779
 Colonel over the Camden County Regiment (1779)

Burgess was elected as a Republican to the 4th and 5th U.S. Congresses, serving from March 4, 1795 to March 3, 1799.

He died in Camden County, North Carolina on January 13, 1800 and was buried in Shiloh Baptist Churchyard.

References

External links

1751 births
1800 deaths
18th-century American politicians
Democratic-Republican Party members of the United States House of Representatives from North Carolina
People from Camden County, North Carolina
People of colonial North Carolina
Burials in North Carolina
North Carolina militiamen in the American Revolution